Miguel Acosta (born April 20, 1978) is a Venezuelan former professional boxer who competed from 1999 to 2016. His nickname is "Aguacerito". He is the former World Boxing Association lightweight champion.

Professional career
Acosta turned professional in 1999 and compiled a record of 26-3-2 before knocking out Paulus Moses on May 29, 2010 to become the new WBA lightweight champion. However Acosta lost the title in his first official defense against Brandon Ríos on February 26, 2011.

Professional boxing record

See also
List of lightweight boxing champions

References

External links

1978 births
Living people
People from Miranda (state)
Venezuelan male boxers
Lightweight boxers
World lightweight boxing champions
World Boxing Association champions